Papa Stour Airstrip is a small airstrip in the village of Biggings on the island of Papa Stour. Shetland, Scotland.

History
Papa Stour Airstrip opened in December 1969 to provide better connections to the mainland for islanders.

Facilities
Papa Stour Airstrip consists of a gravel runway and a small wooden shed. Access to the airstrip is via a metal gate with a notice warning people of the airstrip, Papa Stour Airstrip is located at the end of a short road from the village of Biggings.

Airlines and destinations
As of April 2021 the airstrip is unserved, it was formerly served by PSO flights to Tingwall by Directflight on behalf of Shetland Islands Council.

References

External links

 Shetland Islands Council Internal Air Services

Airports in Shetland
Airports established in 1969